E19 may refer to:
 Chūō Expressway (between Komaki JCT and Okaya on main route) and Nagano Expressway, route E19 in Japan
 European route E19
 HMS E19, a submarine
 Queen's Indian Defense, Encyclopaedia of Chess Openings code
 Sungai Besi–Ulu Klang Elevated Expressway, route E19 in Malaysia